Patrick Ryan (born 13 May 1981)  is a Paralympic wheelchair rugby union player from  Australia. He was born in Brisbane, Queensland. He won a silver medal at the 2000 Sydney Games in the mixed wheelchair rugby event.

References

Paralympic wheelchair rugby players of Australia
Wheelchair rugby players at the 2000 Summer Paralympics
Paralympic silver medalists for Australia
Living people
1981 births
Medalists at the 2000 Summer Paralympics
Paralympic medalists in wheelchair rugby